Cell Mates is a split album by Bowling for Soup on their own Que-so Records with fellow Denton-based artists The V.I.M.S. Only 2,100 copies of the album were released and the album is currently out of print. Bowling for Soup frontman Jaret Reddick considers this album to be the band's second studio album. The band released digitally remastered versions of Bowling for Soup, Cell Mates, and Tell Me When to Whoa through iTunes and Amazon.com in October 2011. "Cody", "Kool-Aid" and "Assman" was re-recorded for release on Rock on Honorable Ones!!.

Track listing

Personnel
The V.I.M.S.
 Robert Hamilton — drums, backing vocals
 Justin James — guitar, backing vocals
 Chris Kruse — lead vocals, guitar
 Nicholas Yovich — bass

Bowling for Soup
 Chris Burney — guitars, backing vocals
 Erik Chandler — bass, backing vocals
 Lance Morrill — drums, backing vocals
 Jaret Reddick — lead vocals, guitars

References

Bowling for Soup albums
1996 EPs
Split albums